Cheshmeh Kabud (also Romanized as Cheshmeh Kabūd; also known as Cheshmeh Kabūd-e Soflá) is a village in Mamulan Rural District, Mamulan District, Pol-e Dokhtar County, Lorestan Province, Iran. At the 2006 census, its population was 205, in 44 families.

References 

Towns and villages in Pol-e Dokhtar County